Efim (Yefim, born Nakhim) Zalmanovich Shifrin (born March 25, 1956) is a Soviet and Russian actor, humorist, singer. Creator and artistic director of "Shifrin-Theater".

Biography
Efim Shifrin was born in 1956 in Magadan region (Neksikan village). In 1973—1974 he studied at philological faculty of Latvian University, and from 1974 to 1978 at stage department of State University of Circus and Stage Art, at the course of Roman Viktyuk.

Since 1977 he started to play in his stage studio of Moscow State University. Among Efim’s theatre works of that time there are the performances «Good-buy, Boys!», «The Night After Release», «Duck Hunting». In 1979 Efim Shifrin became prize winner of the 1st Moscow Contest of Stage Actors. In 1983 Shifrin became prize winner of the 7th USSR’s Contest of Stage Actors. The first solo performance «I Would Like to Say», mainly based on works by Viktor Kokliushkin, was played by Shifrin in 1985. Texts of Viktor Koklyushkin also became the base of performances «Three Questions» and «Round Moon».

In 1990 Efim created «Shifrin-Theatre», which he has been managing till now.

Repertoire of the theatre includes many songs, among which there are romances of Dmitri Shostakovich based on poems by Sasha Chiornyi, songs «Jerusalem» by Mark Minkov, «Music in Me» by Mikhail Kochetkov, «Southern Night» by Aleksandr Klevitskiy and others. In theatre he played in performances «I Do Not Know You Anymore, My Darling», «Love With Patch», «The Putas», «The Goat, or Who is Sylvia» (director Roman Viktyuk), «The Gossips» (director Vadim Dubrovitskiy). In 2006 in Teatrium at Serpukhovka the premiere of performance «The Dragon» based on the play by Evgeny Shvarts (director Vladimir Mirzoev), where Shifrin played the role of Burgomaster, took place.

In 2008 has passed at once two theatrical prime ministers: in Erve Montaigne's role in performance  under Jean Marsana's play (director Valery Sarkisov), and in Harry Essendajna's role in performance  under the play of Noel Kauard directed by Mikhail Kozakov.

Efim Shifrin played in films «Bolotnaya-Street», «The Hero of Our Tribe». In musical «Angel with Cigarette End», staged by Yevgeniy Ginsburg, Efim Shifrin sang 13 songs (music of Aleksandr Klevitskiy, words of Yuriy Riashentsev) and 20 roles in films. In 2007 the premiere of Andrei Konchalovsky's film Gloss, where Shifrin played the role of Marc Shyfer, was held.  In addition, the actor played in  cine-magazine.

For several years in March in State Central Concert Hall «Rossia» Efim Shifrin held benefit performances with participation of stars of Russian stage: «Shifrin Ark», «WWW.SHIFRIN.RU». And in 2006 anniversary benefit performance  was arranged.

Efim Shifrin has written the books  (in co-authorship with G.Viren) and.

In  2000 Shifrin got the award of international network of World Class clubs «Mister Fitness», and in 2006 he was awarded with the Diploma of Physical Training and Sport Committee, Federation of Bodybuilding and Fitness of Government of Moscow for propaganda of sport and healthy way of living. Among the other awards of Efim Shifrin there is Raikin’s Cup (2001) and the 2nd prize and Nikulin’s Cup for participation in TV show of First Channel.

Bibliography 
The River Lethe is Flows («Течет река Лета», 2007 г.)
The World is a Small Place («Мир тесен», 2004 г.)
Personal File of Efim Shifrin («Личное дело Ефима Шифрина», Москва, 1997 г.)
The Theatre Named After Me («Театр имени меня», Москва, «Конец века», 1994 г.)

Interview 
«Getting by on the Russian substitute for vodka»

Citations about Efim Shifrin 
From Internet-blog’s:
...to our opinion, none of the writers,  who write in Russian now, is so close to Kafka with his flagrant gad – loneliness in the crowd, with his piercing solo of humanity in our technogenic age, marked with innumerable conflicts, as Shifrin. <...>  His talent is protean and many-sided. However, the main thing is that Efim Shifrin is the author of four books, unprecedented in their artistry and frankness, appealingness and the special representation of modern world view. <...>  Capability to see the frames of existence in crevices of the implacable time run is the peculiar, wonderful gift, immanent to the talent of Shifrin. Books by Shifrin are characterized with trenchant, piercing frankness through the sad smile of philosopher-child. It’s the system of every single moment perceiving of the new and almost physical need to research the ways of Providence and labyrinths of the human soul. «I’ve paid for my «fairy tales» too high price. For them I gave up of my private life and missed the time, when imagination had to give place to the reality» – Andersen once wrote in his diary, but today these words occur to the readers of the Books by Shifrin...

References

External links
Official Site
 Blog of Efim Shifrin

Russian male comedians
1956 births
Living people
People from Magadan Oblast
Russian male film actors
Russian male stage actors
Soviet male film actors
Soviet male stage actors
Russian humorists
Jewish humorists
Russian travel writers
Russian autobiographers
Russian memoirists
Russian diarists
Soviet directors
University of Latvia alumni
Russian bodybuilders
Jewish Russian comedians
Russian Academy of Theatre Arts alumni
20th-century Russian male singers
20th-century Russian singers
20th-century Russian writers
21st-century Russian writers
20th-century Russian male actors
21st-century Russian male actors
Jewish Russian actors